Thomas Hajek (born February 6, 1978 in Bratislava, Slovakia) is a Slovak-Canadian lacrosse player from St. Catharines, Ontario, who plays for the Philadelphia Wings in the National Lacrosse League. He played Junior lacrosse for the St. Catharines Athletics and Junior hockey for the St. Catharines Falcons.

College career
Hajek attended the University of Vermont and was captain on the men's hockey and a three-year letterwinner in men's lacrosse.

NLL career
Hajek was selected 9th overall in the 2003 NLL Entry Draft by the Philadelphia Wings.  In 2005, he was named the captain of the Philadelphia Wings and was selected to his first NLL East Division All-Star team.  In 2006 and 2007, he was named a starter to the All-Star team.

Statistics

NLL

External links

Thomas Hajek at the Victoria Shamrocks Official Website
Thomas Hajek Selected in 1st Round of National Lacrosse League Draft at the Vermont Cynic Website

1978 births
Living people
Canadian lacrosse players
Czechoslovak emigrants to Canada
Lacrosse people from Ontario
National Lacrosse League All-Stars
Philadelphia Wings players
Sportspeople from Bratislava
Sportspeople from St. Catharines
Vermont Catamounts men's ice hockey players